This is a list of foreign players in Top 14, a rugby union club competition that is played in France.

foreign
 
Top